Rhyl High School is one of two high schools in Rhyl, Wales. It was founded in 1894.

History
Rhyl and District Intermediate School was founded in 1894. In 1901 the school was relocated to Grange Road and became Rhyl County School. The school subsequently became Rhyl Grammar School after the war and finally renamed as Rhyl High School.

In April 2016, the school moved from the 1901 site on Grange Road to a brand new building on the site of the school playing fields.

In June 2017, the school was put in lockdown for 45 minutes due to threats of violence towards pupils attending the school. The incident required the intervention of the police, resulting in the arrest of the 15-year-old culprit.

Alumni
Air Marshall Sir Peter Bairsto, KBE, CB, AFC, DL - RAF officer and Deputy Commander of RAF Strike Command (1981–1984)
Lee Congerton - footballer
Tesni Evans - Wales international squash player
Kimberly Hart-Simpson, actress and businesswoman
Tom Hooson - MP for Brecon and Radnorshire (1979–1985)
Sir John T. Houghton - Scientist and co-chair of Intergovernmental Panel of Climate Change
Ann Jones - Member of the Welsh Assembly for Vale of Clwyd
Professor Harold Lawton
Richard Mills-Owen - Chief Justice of Fiji (1964–1967)
Gareth Williams, Baron Williams of Mostyn - British politician, Leader of the House of Lords (2001–2003)

References

External links
School website
School prospectus

Educational institutions established in 1894
Rhyl
Secondary schools in Denbighshire
1894 establishments in Wales